is a Japanese reality television series in the Terrace House franchise set in Hawaii. It premiered on Netflix as a Netflix Original on November 1, 2016 and ended on August 29, 2017. It is a Netflix and Fuji co-production which is also broadcast on Fuji Television in Japan. This is the first overseas edition of Terrace House. This season was originally planned to last for 24 episodes, but got extended to 36 episodes mid-season.

Cast

Main cast 

*Age when they first joined Terrace House.

Timeline

Guest appearances

Episodes

References

External links 
 Official website
 Terrace House: Aloha State on Fuji Television
 Terrace House: Aloha State on Netflix

Japanese reality television series
Fuji TV original programming
Japanese-language Netflix original programming
Television shows set in Hawaii